Be Your Own Pet (also known as BYOP) is a four-piece punk/garage rock group from Nashville, Tennessee.

Biography 
The band formed in 2004, while all members were in high school at Nashville School of the Arts. Playing house shows and gigs at the all-ages venues Guido's Pizza and Bongo Java, the group honed its spastic-yet-poppy sound. The band released their first single, "Damn Damn Leash" – as a CD-R; the track made its way to BBC Radio One presenter Zane Lowe, whose support for Be Your Own Pet won the band an early U.K. following. Meanwhile, attention-getting gigs at 2004's CMJ and 2005's South by Southwest began creating a buzz for the group stateside. A string of EPs followed.

BYOP performed at festivals such as Coachella, Bonnaroo, Glastonbury, and Reading & Leeds. They also supported bands such as Arctic Monkeys, Sonic Youth, Kings of Leon, amongst others.

The band received critical acclaim from Pitchfork, Rolling Stone, and many other publications such as NME, who named Pearl in the Top 10 of their annual "Cool List", and Nylon, who put the band on the cover of their summer 2006 issue. The group made their debut TV performance on Late Night with Conan O'Brien.

Albums 
The band was signed to XL in the UK and with Thurston Moore's label, Ecstatic Peace/Universal Records in North America. Be Your Own Pet originally released early singles and EPs with Nashville-based Infinity Cat Records.

BYOP released two critically acclaimed albums; their 2006 debut album and 2008's Get Awkward.

Break up 
On August 1, 2008, the band announced on their website that after finishing a small tour of England, they would be breaking up. The band posted the following message on their website: "To all of our fans, we are sad to bring you the news that our upcoming shows in the UK are going to be our last as a band. We thank you for all your love and support these past few years. It's been a blast, but the time has come for the four of us to go our separate ways."

Their final show as a band was at Dingwalls in London in August 2008.

In a 10-year retrospective article for the film Scott Pilgrim vs. the World, director Edgar Wright revealed that Be Your Own Pet was originally asked to write the music for the fictional band Sex Bob-Omb, but their breakup prevented this from happening. The role was then given to Beck.

Side projects 
All of the members of Be Your Own Pet were involved in various other musical projects. Jonas Stein and John Eatherly play together in a band called Turbo Fruits, along with their friend Max Peebles. Nathan Vasquez plays in a band called Deluxin. Jemina Pearl also has side projects: although no longer a member of Cheap Time, she was notably a member of Rare Form. Former member Jamin Orrall plays in JEFF the Brotherhood, along with his brother Jake Orrall.

Post-breakup 
Jemina Pearl released her debut album Break It Up on October 6, 2009, by Ecstatic Peace Records. The album is co-written by John Eatherly and has guest appearances from Thurston Moore, Iggy Pop, Dave Sitek and Derek Stanton.

As of 2012, Jemina Pearl was performing out of Nashville in another garage-punk band called The Ultras S/C, alongside Ben Swank and Chet Weise.

Jonas Stein focused on his side project, Turbo Fruits, which released several albums after Be Your Own Pet's disbanding.

John Eatherly has played drums with bands such as The Virgins, Smith Westerns, Chairlift, and more. He was the lead singer of the band Public Access TV, and is now fronting the project Club Intl.

Reunion 
In March 2022, Be Your Own Pet announced they would be reuniting to perform two concerts in April 2022 opening for Jack White's Supply Chain Issues Tour.

Members 
 Jemina Pearl – vocals
 Nathan Vasquez – bass, backing vocals
 Jonas Stein – guitar, backing vocals
 John Eatherly – drums

Former members 
 Jamin Orrall – drums

Discography

Studio albums 
Be Your Own Pet (March 27, 2006) (Ecstatic Peace/XL) (UK No. 47)
Get Awkward (March 18, 2008), (Ecstatic Peace/XL) (UK No. 101)  (UK Indie No. 7)

EPs 
"Damn Damn Leash EP" (2005) (Japanese release) (Infinity Cat/XL/Rough Trade)
"Summer Sensation" (April 18, 2006) (Ecstatic Peace/Infinity Cat)
"Extra Extra EP" (2006) (Infinity Cat)
"Not Rocket Science" (May 8, 2007) (Infinity Cat)
"Get Damaged EP" (2008) (Ecstatic Peace/XL)

Singles

Appearances 
 SXSW (2005)
 Glastonbury Festival (2005)
 Siren Music Festival (July 16, 2005)
 Summer Sonic Festival (August 2005)
 Coachella Festival (April 30, 2006)
 Bonnaroo Music and Arts Festival 2006
 Late Night with Conan O'Brien (June 13, 2006)
 Subterranean Guide (MTV2, July 30, 2006)
 Lollapalooza 2006 (August 5, 2006)
 Reading and Leeds Festivals (2006)
 MTV Live (Canada) (June 3, 2008)
 Reading and Leeds Festivals (2008)

References

External links 
Jam, James.  Review.  NME.
Raposa, David.  Review. Pitchfork Media. June 6, 2006.
"The 50 Greatest CDs of 2006" Blender Online.  Jan/Feb 2007.  Retrieved February 9, 2007.

Alternative rock groups from Tennessee
Garage rock groups from Tennessee
Garage punk groups
Punk rock groups from Tennessee
Musical groups established in 2002
Musical groups disestablished in 2008
Musical groups reestablished in 2021
Musical groups from Nashville, Tennessee
Ecstatic Peace! artists
XL Recordings artists
2002 establishments in Tennessee